Teplá is a town in Cheb District in the Karlovy Vary Region of the Czech Republic. It has about 2,900 inhabitants. The town centre is well preserved and is protected by law as urban monument zone.

Administrative parts
Villages of Babice, Beranov, Beranovka, Beroun, Bezvěrov, Bohuslav, Číhaná, Heřmanov, Horní Kramolín, Hoštěc, Jankovice, Kladruby, Klášter, Křepkovice, Mrázov, Nezdice, Pěkovice, Popovice, Poutnov, Rankovice, Služetín, Staré Sedlo and Zahrádka are administrative parts of Teplá.

Geography
It lies in the Teplá Highlands, on the Teplá River.

Teplá is situated in the Slavkov Forest Protected Landscape Area.

History

The Teplá Abbey was founded in 1193 by nobleman Hroznata of Ovenec. The first written mention of the town next to the abbey is from 1197. In the 13th century, the town had strategic importance of the land gate with customs and a market and played an important role in land defense. In these times most of the villages in the neighborhood, later incorporated to the municipality, were founded.

Sights
The most significant monument is the Baroque complex of the Teplá Abbey. Its oldest preserved part is the Romanesque-Gothic Church of the Annunciation of the Lord. The complex is opened to the public and serves also as a library, museum and gallery.

The Gothic Church of Saint Giles in the town's centre was built on the site of the former church in 1762–1765. Its most valuable part are frescoes from scenes from the life of Saint Giles by Elias Dollhopf from 1765.

The Renaissance town hall belong to the oldest buildings in the town. It was built in 1572–1574 and formerly served as a Latin school. Valuable is also the Old Town Hall, built in the Baroque style in 1698.

There are three significant mineral springs in Teplá, the best of which is Oriona. Until 1945, a bottling plant stood at the source of Oriona. Now it's just a well covered with a gazebo.

Notable people
Gerhard Auer (1943–2019), German rower, Olympic champion

Twin towns – sister cities

Teplá is twinned with:
 Konnersreuth, Germany

References

External links

Cities and towns in the Czech Republic
Populated places in Cheb District